2-Ketoarginine methyltransferase (mrsA (gene)) is an enzyme with systematic name S-adenosyl-L-methionine:5-carbamimidamido-2-oxopentanoate S-methyltransferase. This enzyme catalyses the following chemical reaction

 S-adenosyl-L-methionine + 5-guanidino-2-oxopentanoate  S-adenosyl-L-homocysteine + 5-guanidino-3-methyl-2-oxopentanoate

The enzyme is involved in production of the rare amino acid 3-methylarginine.

References

External links 
 

EC 2.1.1